Tickler may refer to:
 Tickler file, a collection of date-labeled file folders
 Tickler oscillator, a type of electronic circuit

Ships
  – one of several vessels of the British Royal Navy named Tickler